The mixed doubles tournament of the 2016 Badminton Asia Junior Championships was held from July 13 to 17 at the CPB Badminton and Sports Science Training Center, Bangkok. The defending champions of the last edition were Zheng Siwei and Chen Qingchen from China. He Jiting / Du Yue of China and Pakin Kuna-Anuvit / Kwanchanok Sudjaipraparat of Thailand leads the seeding this year. The former mixed doubles bronze medalist in the last edition He and Du emerged as the champion after defeat the South Korean duo Kim Won-ho and Lee Yu-rim in the finals with the score 21–12, 19–21, 21–19.

Seeded

 He Jiting / Du Yue (champions)
 Pakin Kuna-Anuvit / Kwanchanok Sudjaipraparat (second round)
 Rinov Rivaldy / Apriani Rahayu (semi final)
 Pachaarapol Nipornram / Ruethaichanok Laisuan (second round)
 Andika Ramadiansyah / Mychelle Chrystine Bandaso (quarter final)
 Hiroki Okamura / Nami Matsuyama (third round)
 Lam Wai Lok / Ng Tsz Yau (second round)
 Zhu Junhao / Zhou Chaomin (quarter final)

Finals

Top half

Section 1

Section 2

Section 3

Section 4

Bottom half

Section 5

Section 6

Section 7

Section 8

References

External links 
Main Draw

Mixed
Asia Junior